Drohi is a 2010 Indian Tamil-language action film written and directed by Sudha Kongara Prasad, starring Srikanth, Vishnu, Poorna, Poonam Bajwa and Thiagarajan in lead roles. It was dubbed into hindi as drohi. The film released on 10 September 2010 to positive reviews.

Plot
Sami Srinivasan (Srikanth), a Brahmin boy, and his friend Karunakaran (Vishnu) grow up in the Royapuram slums and attend the same school. Karuna is a rough and tough boy, but Sami is a bit naive. They are close buddies. Once, they see their class teacher Roja (Pooja Umashanker), being brutally murdered before their eyes by a gangster. Dejected at local police not taking any action, Karuna kills the gangster but gets caught by the cops. Sami tells the police that Karuna committed the murder. However, both are bailed out of trouble, enmity brews between them. As years roll, hatred increases. Also, as fate would have it, a twist occurs: the two characters switch roles. Sami, who was naïve as a kid, turns into a rowdy and becomes the right hand of local gangster Narayanan (Thiagarajan) when he becomes an adult. In contrast, Karuna, who was very violent and brutal in his childhood, turns out into an honest and brave police officer who gets posted in his same locality. Sami is still against Karuna. Trouble erupts when Sami loves Karuna's sister Malar (Poorna). In the meantime, Shruthi (Poonam Bajwa) loves Karuna. What happens between the two forms for the rest of the film.

Cast

 Srikanth as Sami Srinivasan
 Vishnu as Karunakaran
 Poorna as Malar
 Poonam Bajwa as Shruthi and Lochani (Voice Dubbed By Renuka Kathir)
 Thiagarajan as Narayanan
 Tanikella Bharani as Nanaji
 Manobala as Raghu
 Kishore DS as Young Karuna
 S. N. Lakshmi
 Mime Gopi
 Rajeevan
 Alphonse Roy
 Pooja Umashanker as Roja (Guest appearance)
 S. P. B. Charan as Venkat (Guest appearance)
 Rachana Maurya as item number

Soundtrack
The music was composed by V. Selvaganesh, Devi Sri Prasad and Bharadwaj
 "Sama Sama Yama Yama" - Silambarasan, Tippu, Karthik, Maya
 "Konjam Konjam Vendum" - Ranina Reddy, Srikanth
 "Adi Kutti Maa" - Ranjith, KK, Suchithra Karthik, Maya Sricharan
 "Sambhavaami Yuge Yuge" - Shankar Mahadevan, Naveen, Faraz
 "Vaalaatum Rowdy Kuttam" - Sowmya Rao, Maya Sricharan
 "Drohi Theme" - Bigg Nikk of Machas With Attitude, Maya Sricharan, Raam

References

External links
 

2010 films
2010s Tamil-language films
2010 crime action films
Indian neo-noir films
Indian crime action films
2010 directorial debut films
Films directed by Sudha Kongara